Vicente Phillip Reyes Núñez (born 19 November 2003) is a professional footballer who plays as a goalkeeper for USL Championship side Atlanta United 2. Born in the United States, he represents Chile at youth level.

Club career
Born in Charleston, South Carolina, Reyes joined the academy at Major League Soccer club Atlanta United in 2016. On 3 September 2020, Reyes made his professional debut for Atlanta United 2, the club's reserve team, against Philadelphia Union II. He started and played the whole match as Atlanta United 2 won 2–1. 

On 7 January 2022, Reyes signed his first professional contract with Atlanta United 2.

International career
On 7 October 2018, Reyes made his debut for the Chile under-17 side against the United States U17. Also, he took part of the Chile U15 squad at the UEFA U-16 Development Tournament on April 2019.

In September 2022, he made two appearances for Chile at under-20 level in the Costa Cálida Supercup. In 2023, he made four appearances in the South American U20 Championship.

Career statistics

Club

References

External links
Profile at the US Soccer Development Academy website

2003 births
Living people
People from Charleston, South Carolina
Soccer players from South Carolina
Chilean footballers
Chile youth international footballers
Chile under-20 international footballers
American soccer players
American people of Chilean descent
Sportspeople of Chilean descent
Citizens of Chile through descent
Association football goalkeepers
Atlanta United 2 players
USL Championship players
Naturalized citizens of Chile